Ralf Kapschack (born 24 December 1954) is a German politician of the Social Democratic Party (SPD) who has been serving as a member of the Bundestag from the state of North Rhine-Westphalia from 2013 to October 2021.

Political career 
Kapschack became a member of the Bundestag in the 2013 German federal election. He is a member of the Committee on Labour and Social Affairs and the Committee on Petitions.

In October 2020, Kapschack announced that he would not stand in the 2021 federal elections but instead resign from active politics by the end of the parliamentary term.

References

External links 

  
 Bundestag biography 

1954 births
Living people
Members of the Bundestag for North Rhine-Westphalia
Members of the Bundestag 2017–2021
Members of the Bundestag 2013–2017
Members of the Bundestag for the Social Democratic Party of Germany
People from Witten